Naagdev is a 2018 Indian, Bhojpuri language action- drama film directed by Dev Pandey and produced by Neelabh Tiwari, Ram Karan Gaud and Ramesh Singh under banner of "Rambha Entertainment" and "Neelabh Tiwari Films". Starring Khesari Lal Yadav in the lead role and Kajal Raghwani in an opposite role. Awadhesh Mishra, Dev Singh, Ritu Pandey, Vinod Mishra, Anoop Arora, Samarth Chaturvedi, J Neelam, Maya Yadav, Reena Rani, Prakash Jais, Sanjay Mahanand, Priya Sharma, Rohit Singh "Matru" and Sweety Singh play supporting roles, this film was first to introduce Vfx in Bhojpuri cinema.

Plot
The story begins from Devghar where Shivani along with her parents come to offer water to Bhole Baba and in the same night Nagina  also comes from the Naglok to offer water to the invisible Shivaling of Lord Shankar. And he had to go back to Naglok before lunar eclipse, But a demon named Trikal  imprisons her and Shivani dies for saving Nagina. Nagina calls her parents to go to Naglok who is the king and queen of Naglok and her parents appear and tells him that while saving him, Shivani died, who is an exclusive devotee of Mahadev. Nagina is guilty of this, so she is not able to go to Naglok. Then Nagina asks Nageshwar  to remedy it, then Nageshwar tells that he must abandon his body and enter Shivani's dead body and then when Shivani becomes young and her parents marry her with her own wish then she will be free from this sin. Trikal overhears all these things and he attacks Nagina again, then Nagina calls her husband Nagdev  for help, Nagdev protects her from Trikal.Then Nagina enters the dead body of Shivani after abandoning her body according to Nageshwar and Shivani becomes alive. Nagdev also leads an ordinary life by not returning to Naglok as Dev. When Shivani goes young, one day on Nag Panchami, she goes to the temple to worship where Rajan  teases her and then Dev saves Shivani.Trikal begs his Mahamahim again and his Mahamahim tells him that if he marries Shivani he will become the most powerful man in the world. Trikal then goes to Shivani again but Nagdev again protects her. Due to which, Trikal attacks Shivani's father, Dev protects them and takes them to their house where Shivani tells her father that she loves Dev and wants to marry him and his father gets agree for married. At the wedding of Dev and Shivani, Trikal sends her disciple Bhairavi, who after playing a bean brings Dev in his real snake form, which makes everyone afraid and Bhairavi imprisons Dev. Shivani's parents get angry knowing Dev's reality. Shivani then seeks help from her friend, who is a police officer, he arrests Bhairavi and saves Nagdev, but Shivani's parents do not agree to marry her. But when he discovers the truth that Shivani is dead in his childhood, there is Nagina's soul in Shivani's body, then he marries Shivani to Nagdev. After his marriages Trikal is furious and goes to his Mahamahim, then his Mahamahim tells, if you destroy Nagina's dead body, then Nagina will not be able to go to Naglok. Hearing this, Trilok frees Bhairavi from jail and Bhairavi acquires Nagina's dead body from Sokha's house and goes to the forest to destroy it, but Nagdev comes there again to save Nagina's dead body. There is a fierce battle between Nagdev and Trikal and Trikal is killed at the hands of Nagdev, then Nagina's soul comes out of Shivani's body and enters Nagina's dead body, thus she is freed from sin and goes to Naglok.

Cast
Khesari Lal Yadav as Naagdev/Dev (dual role)
Kajal Raghwani as Nagina/Shivani
Awdhesh Mishra as Trikal
 Dev Singh as Rajan
 Anoop Arora as Rajan's father
 J Neelam as Rajan's Mother
 Samarth Chaturvedi as Shivani's father
 Maya Yadav as Shivani's mother
 Ritu Pandey as Bhairavi
 Vinod Mishra as Nageshwar (Nagina's father)
 Reena Rani as Nagina's mother
 Prakash Jais as Constable
 Sanjay Mahanand as Sokha Ji
 Rohit Singh "Matru" as Changu (Rajan's friend)
 Priya Sharma as Shivani's friend
 Sweety Singh as Soogi

Production
The film's VFX received much attention. 40% of the film was made with VFX. Naagdev is Khesari Lal Yadav's first graphical film.

Trade analyst believe that the level of graphics used in this film reflects the technical richness and diversity of Bhojpuri cinema. The scenery of the pond, the river, the ocean, the green valleys and the heaven-hell are very amazing. The film's director Dev Pandey has taken many courageous steps in this film.

The script of 'Naagdev' has been written by Manoj K. Kushwaha while music has been composed by Madhukar Anand. Art direction done by Anjani Tiwari. The cinematography is by R. R. Prince. Kanu Mukharjee, Pappu Khanna and Rikki Gupta have choreographed the dance numbers. Dileep Yadav has directed the action and stunts in the film. Costume designed by Santosh Prajapati while publicity designed by Narsu Bahera (Shakti Arts). Post-production done in "Audio Lab". VFX done by Chinku Sahu (AD Studio).

Release
The film was theatrically released on 16 November 2018 across Bihar and Jharkhand. Film also released in Mumbai and Gujarat on 28 December 2018 with positive reviews.

Soundtrack

The soundtrack for "Naagdev" was composed by Madhukar Anand with lyrics written by Azad Singh and Shyam Dehati. There are total seven songs in album. It was produced under the "Enter10 Music Bhojpuri" label, who also bought his satellite rights.

Marketing
The first-look poster was released on 12 May 2018 and second-look poster was released on 13 June 2018.

Trailer of this film was released on 16 October 2018 at YouTube official Channel of "Enter10 Music Bhojpuri" and it got 1.8 million views in just 24 hours. As of May 2020, it received more than 33 million views on YouTube and create a record of "Most Viewed Bhojpuri Trailer".

References

2018 films
Indian action drama films
2010s Bhojpuri-language films
2018 action drama films